Otra Nota (English: Another Note) is the debut album by American singer Marc Anthony that was released on January 26, 1993, by RMM Records. Produced by Sergio George, it was the first album by Anthony to record in salsa after starting his career as a freestyle musician. Recording of the album began after Anthony asked RMM president Ralph Mercado to record Juan Gabriel's "Hasta Que Te Conocí" in salsa after hearing it on the radio during a taxi ride. Recorded on a low budget, the album peaked at No. 2 on the Billboard Tropical Albums chart and reached No. 30 on the Billboard Top Latin Albums chart.

The album was well received by critics who complimented George's production and Anthony's youthful voice. Anthony received two awards for "Best New Artists" at the Billboard Latin Music Awards and the Lo Nuestro Awards. The album produced three singles: "Hasta Que Te Conocí", "Palabras del Alma", and "Si Tú No Te Fueras", all of which charted on the Billboard Hot Latin Songs chart. As of 2002, Otra Nota has sold over 300,000 copies.

Background
Marc Anthony began his recording career in 1980s as a freestyle musician during which he was a backup vocalist for boy bands such as Menudo and the Latin Rascals. Anthony also wrote songs for his school friend Sa-Fire, including "Boy I've Been Told" which became a hit on the Billboard Hot 100 chart. Anthony got his start as a lead vocalist when he collaborated with Little Louie Vega on the album When the Night Is Over. The lead single "Ride on the Rhythm" became a number-one hit on the Billboard Hot Dance Club Songs chart.

RMM manager Ralph Mercado invited Anthony to record a salsa album, but Anthony declined the offer due to a lack of interest to record in Spanish. The following day, while in a taxi, Anthony was listening to Juan Gabriel's song "Hasta Que Te Conocí" ("Until I Met You") on the radio and was motivated to record the song in salsa and told Mercado about his change of mind. Mercado introduced Anthony to Sergio George who would produce the album. According to George, the album was a "total experiment", citing that it was on low budget, recorded with one musician at a time without a band, and the full production was done on computers while George handled the keyboards. Otra Nota recording took place at the Active Recordings in New York City in 1992.

Music and lyrics

The album includes five compositions and three cover songs. The lead track "Palabras del Alma" ("Words from the Soul") is a cover originally performed and written by Ilan Chester. "Si Tú No Te Fueras" ("If You Would Not Leave") was composed by Nelson Frank and Jaime Gutierrez. "Hasta Que Te Conocí" was first performed and written by Juan Gabriel. "El Último Beso" was composed by Anthony's father Felipe Muñíz. "Make It With You" is a cover of American band Bread's song. "Necesito Amarte" was written by Luis Castillo who composed songs for RMM recording artists including José Alberto "El Canario" and Tito Nieves.  Sergio George co-wrote "¿Juego O Amor?" ("Game or Love?") along with Adam Sez. The final track, "Si He de Morir" ("If I Were to Die") was composed by Dominican Luis "Terror" Díaz.

Commercial reception
Otra Nota debuted and peaked at No. 2 on the Billboard Tropical Albums chart during the week of April 17, 1993, behind Jerry Rivera's Cuenta Conmigo and remained at this position for eight weeks.  During the week of June 11, 1994, the album debuted and peaked at No. 30 on the Billboard Top Latin Albums, where it spent nineteen weeks on the chart. Otra Nota had sold over 300,000 copies as of 2002.

Singles
"Hasta Que Te Conocí" was the first single to be released from the album and peaked at No. 13 on the Billboard Hot Latin Songs chart. The second single "Palabras del Alma" peaked at No. 15 on the Billboard Hot Latin Songs chart. "Si Tú No Te Fueras" was the last single released from the album which peaked at No. 31 on the Billboard Hot Latin Songs chart.

Critical reception

Evan Gutierrez of AllMusic gave the album 3.5 out of 5 stars and complemented Anthony's voice as "developed, unique, and individual" and felt that Anthony's debut "brought quality and passion to his listeners from the beginning." Gutierrez also found the songs in salsa enjoyable while calling the ballads. Gutierrez praised Sergio George's arrangements as "outstanding" though he felt the production was outdated in places. An editor for Billboard magazine referred to the album as a "smashing salsa premier" and praised George's "customary fine" arrangements. The Los Angeles Times music critic Enrique Lopetegui gave the album 3 out of 4 stars, noting that while Anthony was viewed with skepticism on the salsa market, he felt that Anthony "may be the best of the many newborn salseros." Lopetegui also praised Anthony's vocals as "excellent" and described the overall album as "noble effort" though he criticized Anthony's cover of "Make It With You" as unnecessary. The album led to Anthony receiving a Billboard Latin Music Award for "Tropical/Salsa New Artist of the Year" and the Lo Nuestro Award for Tropical New Artist of the Year in 1994.

Track listing

Personnel
The following credits are from AllMusic.

Musicians

Bobby Allende – bongos
Gabriela Anders – background vocals
Luis Bonilla – trombone
Lucho Cabarcas – background vocals
William Cepeda – trombone
Ray Colon – bongos
José Garcia – arranger, guitar, tres ("Necesito Amarte")
Sergio George – arranger, keyboards, background vocals
Phil Hamilton – guitar  ("Juego o Amor", "Make it With You")
Ite Jerez – trumpet
Renaldo Jorge – trombone
Lewis Kahn – violin
Joe King – background vocals
Rene Leyva – horn arrangements ("Necesito Amarte")
Luis Lopez – trombone
Pablo "Chino" Nuñez – timbales
Papo Pepin – conga, percussion
Johnny Rivera  – background vocals
Piro Rodriguez – trumpet
Rubén Rodríguez – bass

Technical 

J. Albelo – artwork, design
Phil Austin – mastering
Ricardo Betancourt – photography
Sergio George – drum programming, engineer, keyboards, mastering, producer, programming
David Maldonado – executive Producer
Elena C. Martínez – art direction
Ralph Mercado – executive Producer
Kurt Upper – engineer, mixing

Chart performance

Weekly charts

Year-end charts

See also
1993 in Latin music

References

1993 debut albums
Marc Anthony albums
Albums produced by Sergio George
RMM Records albums
Spanish-language albums